Zdravo (trans. Hello) was a Yugoslav disco group from Belgrade.

Band history
The group was formed in 1976 by the disk jockey Boban Petrović. Having gathered several teenagers and several Belgrade musicians, Petrović intended to form a band which would perform communicative disco music with funk influences. In order to attract media attention, Petrović chose the name Zdravo after the youth magazine Zdravo, which Politika Newspapers and Magazines started publishing at about the same time. The first lineup consisted of Boban Petrović (vocals, keyboards), Dragan Jovanović (guitar, later a member of the hard rock band Generacija 5), Branko Kojić (bass guitar, later a member of the new wave band Grupa I), Vlastimir Cvetković (drums), and vocalists and dancers Boža Jeremić, Vladislav Kukolj, and Branko Popović. The band also performed with female dancers, African girls from Zaire.

The band's only big hit was the song "Vikend fobija" ("Weekend Phobia"), released in 1977. Although the song became a hit, it was generally disliked by the critics. Soon after, Jovanović left the band to form Generacija 5, so Popović invited at the time unknown guitarist Momčilo Bajagić to join the band. However, Bajagić refused the invitation, and the new member of the band became a former Innamorata member Branko Pešić "Amerikanac".

In August 1977, Zdravo performed as one of the opening bands on Bijelo Dugme concert at Hajdučka česma, at the end of the same year, they performed as an opening band on Indexi Yugoslav tour. As Petrović was at the time in a relationship with singer Slađana Milošević, the band played on her debut single "Au au", and Milošević often performed with the band. In 1978, the original Zdravo lineup disbanded, and Petrović continued performing under the name Zdravo with various musicians, also performing with the band Orion. After releasing the single "Žalba" ("Complaint"), Popović disbanded the band, and released the following two singles under the name Boban Petrović & Zdravo, also recording the single "Moram" ("I Have To") with Gordana Ivandić in 1979.

Post-breakup
Petrović dedicated himself to his solo career, releasing studio album Žur (Party) in 1981, and Zora (Dawn) in 1984. The albums, however, did not see big success. In 1986, he published the novel Rokanje (Rocking) focused on the 1980s Belgrade nightlife. After that, he withdrew from the public scene and moved abroad, where he started working as businessman, for a certain time being an owner of the Spanish football club CA Marbella. 

In 2006, his song "Prepad" ("Raid") from the album Žur was ranked No. 82 on the B92 Top 100 Domestic Songs list.

Discography

Singles
"Vikend fobija" / "Roditeljski savet" (1977)
"Disko je prava stvar" / "Raspust i kraj" (1977)
"Sugestivni rok" / "Žalba" (1978)
"Kuc-Guc-Štuc" / "'Ajmo na žurku" (1979)
"Sa tobom, Crvena zvezdo, ja sam jak" / "Balada o šampionu" (1980)

References 
Notes

Source
EX YU ROCK enciklopedija 1960-2006, Janjatović Petar; 

Serbian rock music groups
Serbian pop rock music groups
Serbian funk musical groups
Yugoslav rock music groups
Disco groups
Musical groups from Belgrade
Musical groups established in 1978
Musical groups disestablished in 1980